Flat Top (also released as Eagles of the Fleet) is a 1952 American drama war film filmed in Cinecolor, directed by Lesley Selander and starring Sterling Hayden, with early appearances from Phyllis Coates, Jack Larson, Richard Carlson, and William Schallert. The film earned William Austin an Academy Award nomination for Best Film Editing in 1953.

Plot
The film begins on board an aircraft carrier off from the coast of Korea during the Korean War. Commander Collier (Hayden) is the Commander Air Group (CAG), or Air Boss, in charge of air operations on the carrier, or 'flat top'. When asked about how he first handled his job, he goes back to the time of World War II, where the rest of the film takes place. Told in flashback form, Collier recounts the war in the Pacific, working flight ops on the same carrier as the Fighter Squadron Commander with a new Executive Officer, LT Joe Rogers (Carlson), and getting a group of fighter pilots ready for the tough fight to come against the Japanese.

Cast
 Sterling Hayden as Cmdr. Dan Collier
 Richard Carlson as Lt. (j.g.) Joe Rodgers
 William Phipps as Red Kelley (as Bill Phipps)
 John Bromfield as Ens. Snakehips McKay
 Keith Larsen as Ens. Barney Smith / Barney Oldfield
 William Schallert as Ens. Longfellow
 Todd Karns as Judge
 Phyllis Coates as Dorothy Collier
 Dave Willock as Willie
 Walter Coy as Air Group Commander
 Jack Larson as "Scuttlebutt" Sailor

See also
 Sterling Hayden filmography

References

External links
 

1952 films
1952 drama films
1950s war drama films
1950s English-language films
American war drama films
Films directed by Lesley Selander
Films produced by Walter Mirisch
World War II aviation films
Cinecolor films
Pacific War films
Monogram Pictures films
1950s American films